ENZSO is the eponymous debut album by the ENZSO project led by Eddie Rayner. The orchestral recording sessions were held at Symphony House in Wellington and National Radio Studios for the New Zealand Youth Choir.

Track listing
"Poor Boy" performed by Dave Dobbyn
"Message to My Girl" performed by Neil Finn
"I Hope I Never" performed by Annie Crummer
"Straight Old Line" performed by Neil Finn
"Stuff and Nonsense" performed by Neil Finn
"Albert of India" performed by Eddie Rayner
"My Mistake" performed by Dave Dobbyn
"Voices" performed by Neil Finn
"I See Red" performed by Tim Finn
"Under the Wheel" performed by Sam Hunt
"Dirty Creature" performed by Tim Finn
"Stranger Than Fiction" performed by Tim Finn, Neil Finn, Sam Hunt + "Time for a Change" performed by Tim Finn

Notes 
 Some versions have a slightly different track listing. 13 tracks are listed, but "Stranger Than Fiction" and "Time for a Change" are joined together as one long track, making for a total of 12.
 "Albert of India" （Instrumental） is performed by Eddie Rayner， it is also included in the ENZSO "Poor Boy" Single CD.
 "I Hope I Never" is also included in Annie Crummer's compilation album, Shine: The Best of Annie Crummer (2002)

Charts

Weekly charts

Year-end charts

Certifications and sales

References

1996 albums
Enzso albums
Split Enz